Albrecht Schmidt (9 April 1870 – 5 March 1945) was a Danish film actor. He appeared in 13 films between 1911 and 1941. He was born in Copenhagen, Denmark.

Filmography
 Skæbnebæltet (1911)
 Morfinisten (1911)
 Atlantis (1913)
 Klostret i Sendomir (1920)
 Häxan (1922)
 5 raske piger (1933)
 Flight from the Millions (1934)
 Sun Over Denmark (1936)
 En fuldendt gentleman (1937)
 Den kloge Mand (1937)
 Kongen bød (1938)
 Sommerglæder (1940)
 Niels Pind og hans dreng (1941)

References

External links

1870 births
1945 deaths
Danish male film actors
Danish male silent film actors
20th-century Danish male actors
Male actors from Copenhagen